Little T may refer to:
 Tim Fite, American singer-songwriter/rapper/musician (frontman of Little-T and One Track Mike)
 Natasja Saad (1974–2007), Danish rapper
 Charlie Teagarden (1913–1984), American jazz trumpeter